Claudia Ortiz may refer to:

 Claudia Ortiz de Zevallos Cano (born 1981), Peruvian model
 Claudia Ortiz (El Salvador) (Claudia Mercedes Ortiz Menjívar; born 1987), Salvadoran politician